The 1976 Soviet Chess Championship was the 44th edition of USSR Chess Championship. Held from 26 November to 24 December 1976 in Moscow. The world champion Anatoly Karpov won his first USSR Chess Championship title. The qualifying tournaments took place in Minsk and Rostov-on-Don.

Table and results

References 

USSR Chess Championships
Championship
Chess
1976 in chess
Chess